Huwat  is a Syrian village located in Mahardah Nahiyah in Mahardah District, Hama.  According to the Syria Central Bureau of Statistics (CBS), Huwat had a population of 128 in the 2004 census.

References 

Populated places in Mahardah District